Tomas Ocaña Urwitz (Madrid, January 20, 1984) is a Spanish journalist awarded for his investigative reports, among others, with a Peabody Award, an Investigative Reporters and Editors award and three Emmy awards in different categories. He worked for nearly five years as a reporter and producer for Univision Investiga, a department managed by the Pulitzer Prize winner Gerardo Reyes. Together they uncovered cases of corruption, drug trafficking, labor exploitation, fraud, gun trafficking and environmental destruction, visiting a dozen countries in order to make it possible. He has also been involved in some of the most important global investigations such as Panama Papers or Swissleaks. In 2015 Tomas was appointed to represent his country, Spain, as ambassador of the project ´Made of talent´.

Career 
With a degree in both Law and Journalism at the Carlos III University, he began his career at CNN + / Cuatro, to eventually become the executive producer of 'El Telediario de Intereconomia'. In January 2012 Ocaña arrives at Univision to join the newly created Documentaries department.

After a short stay in this department, he was promoted to work as a reporter and producer at Univision Investiga, the newly created investigative department of the network led by the colombian journalist Gerardo Reyes. Between 2012 and 2016, Ocana has produced investigative reports in Spain, United States, Mexico, Brazil, Argentina, Dominican Republic, Peru, Colombia, Panama and Germany.

Among the most relevant assignments of Univision Investiga is the outstanding work on how the Mexican trafficker Joaquin "El Chapo" Guzman forged his drug empire. Four months before the capture of Guzman in 2014 (there would be a new capture in 2016 following the escape of the prisoner in 2015), Univision broadcast a special report called 'El Chapo Guzman, the eternal fugitive'. This report meant an international recognition for both the team and the network for broadcasting the first in-depth approach to the insights of the world's most powerful drug trafficker. In 2014, the documentary obtained the Emmy Award for the best investigative journalism in Spanish. Tomas  was a finalist for the Livingston Awards, which recognizes the work of journalists under 35.

Another of Tomas’s investigative awarded special report was 'Fast and Furious, arming the enemy', which got him a Peabody Award, the first prize of the IRE (Investigative Reporters and Editors) and the second place in the National Headliner Award. This special report located the whereabouts of dozens of weapons from the operation led by the Bureau of Alcohol, Tobacco, Firearms and Explosives. The United States Congress  requested Univision Investiga the data from the report for analysis in the internal investigation of the camera on this  operation.

In 'Los nuevos Narcotesoros', Univision Investiga explored the criminal activities undertaken by the drug cartels in order to identify their sources of income. That includes the smuggling of undocumented immigrants, forced prostitution, kidnapping, extortion, theft of fuel and mining illicit minerals like gold and iron, which was uncovered as the most profitable of all. Thanks to this work, for the second consecutive year, Univision Investiga won the Emmy Award for best investigative journalism in Spanish. The multimedia version of this project won the Ortega y Gasset Journalism Award.

Ocaña and the Univision Investiga team achieved that same year a second statuette at the 36th Emmy Awards as part of the Univision News team who covered the murder of the 43 Mexican students killed in Iguala. The job was awarded in the 'Outstanding Coverage of a breaking news story in Spanish' category.

In 2016, the report 'Tall Tale' won the National Journalism Award in Mexico, by unclogging the political-business intricacies of the largest cash seizure in world history: US$205 million. The work was conducted by Univision Investiga and the Investigative Reporting Program at Berkeley University. This joint research was nominated in the 37th edition of the Emmy Awards, a gala in which Tomas had two other nominations.

Awards 

Peabody Award (2013) for 'Fast and Furious, arming the enemy'
Investigative Reporters & Editors Award  (2013), for 'Fast and Furious, arming the enemy'
Emmy Award for Outstanding Investigative Journalism in Spanish (2014) for 'El Chapo, the eternal fugitive'
Nominated for The Livingston Awards for Young Journalist (2014)
Codirector of the documentary 'PRESSured', Gracie Award for the best documentary (2014)
Emmy Award for Outstanding Investigative Journalism in Spanish (2015) for 'Los Nuevos Narcotesoros'
Emmy Award for Outstanding Coverage of a Breaking News Story in Spanish (2015) for 'La Masacre de Iguala'
Part of the team awarded with the Ortega y Gasset on the multimedia category (2015) for 'Los Nuevos Narcotesoros'
National Journalism Award of Mexico in the category Research Report on TV (2016), for 'A tall tale'.

References

Spanish journalists
1984 births
Living people